Sachiko is a Vocaloid 4 vocal. Its voice samples are based on Japanese actress, voice actress, and one of the leading enka singers in Japan, Sachiko Kobayashi.

Development
Sachiko was revealed on the Vocaloid website on July 23, 2015. A job plugin called "Sachikobushi" was available, which aimed to facilitate realistic reproduction of Kobayashi's voice. It would also include ExVoice for sounds such as shouting. The first demo and a digital download of the voicebank were both released on July 27. Preorders for the physical box and trial versions were also available. The boxed version would be sold in August.

Additional software
Sachiko's voice was also released for Mobile Vocaloid Editor.

References

Vocaloids introduced in 2015
Fictional singers
Japanese idols
Japanese popular culture